William Veeder (born September 14, 1940) is a scholar of 19th-century American and British literature and a Professor Emeritus in the Department of English at the University of Chicago.

Early life
William Veeder was born on September 14, 1940, in Denver, Colorado to Virginia Holderness and author William H. Veeder. He grew up in Arlington, Virginia.

Education
William Veeder completed his undergraduate studies at Notre Dame, and then spent two years at the University of Iowa Writers’ Workshop, where he earned his Master of Fine Arts. Veeder received his Ph.D. from the University of California at Berkeley in 1969, and joined the faculty at the University of Chicago that same year.

Critical methodology
William Veeder’s critical methodology is primarily rooted in psychoanalysis and gender theory, but he is also a strong advocate of close reading, a critical approach whereby “one gets to content through form”. He is guided by a quote from an art criticism essay written by Henry James, in which James asserted, “In the arts, feeling is always meaning.” Veeder begins his classes with this quote, usually underlining the words “always” and "meaning” and capitalizing the word “always.”

Works
Veeder has been working for over 25 years on a historical novel about Ambrose Bierce and Emma Frances Dawson, which as of 2005 was unpublished and nameless.

Veeder's publications include:

 Henry James, the Lessons of the Master: Popular Fiction and Personal Style in the Nineteenth Century. U of Chicago P, 1975.
 The Woman Question: Society and Literature in Britain and America, 1837–1883, Volume 1: Defining Voices. Elizabeth K. Helsinger, Robin Lauterbach Sheets, William Veeder. U of Chicago P, 1989, c1983.
 The Woman Question: Society and Literature in Britain and America, 1837–1883, Volume 2: Social Issues. Elizabeth K. Helsinger, Robin Lauterbach Sheets, William Veeder. U of Chicago P, 1989, c1983.
 Mary Shelley & Frankenstein: the Fate of Androgyny. U of Chicago P, 1986.
 Dr. Jekyll and Mr. Hyde: After One Hundred Years. Edited by William Veeder and Gordon Hirsch. U of Chicago P, 1988.
 Art of Criticism.  Edited by William Veeder and Susan M. Griffin. U of Chicago P, 1988.

His essays have appeared in:
 The Henry James Review
 New essays on The portrait of a lady. Edited by Joel Porte. Cambridge University Press, 1990.
 Henry James: the shorter fiction, reassessments. Edited by N.H. Reeve. St. Martin’s Press, 1997.
 American gothic: new interventions in a national narrative.  Edited by Robert K. Martin & Eric Savoy.  University of Iowa Press, c1998.
 Mary Shelley’s Frankenstein. Edited and introduced by Harold Bloom.

References

Notes

Bibliography

External links
 http://catalog.uchicago.edu/divisions/english-courses.html

1940 births
American literary critics
University of Chicago faculty
Living people
University of Notre Dame alumni
University of California, Berkeley alumni
Iowa Writers' Workshop alumni